Below is an incomplete list of fictional feature films or miniseries released since 1990 which feature events of World War II in the narrative.

Restrictions
 The film or miniseries must be concerned with World War II (or the Sino-Japanese War) and include events that feature as a part of the war effort.
 For short films, see the List of World War II short films.
 For documentaries, see the List of World War II documentary films and the List of Allied propaganda films of World War II.

Fictional feature films specifically pertaining to the Holocaust appear in the List of Holocaust films#Narrative films.

Common topics
Many aspects of this conflict have repeatedly been the subject of drama. These common subjects will not be linked when they appear in the film descriptions below:

Europe
Adolf Hitler, Nazis and Nazism
Nazi Germany and the Third Reich
Wehrmacht, Luftwaffe, Kriegsmarine, Gestapo and Waffen-SS
Benito Mussolini
Kingdom of Italy
Royal Italian Army, Regia Marina, Regia Aeronautica and Blackshirts
Death camps, Nazi concentration camps, earlier concentration camps
Partition and occupation of Poland and Polish resistance
Occupied France, Vichy France and French Resistance
Occupied Norway
The Holocaust

Asia–Pacific
Emperor Hirohito
Empire of Japan
Imperial Japanese Army and Imperial Japanese Navy

Non-geographical
POW

Before 1990

1990s

1990–1994

1995–1999

2000s

2000–2004

2005–2009

2010s

2010–2014

2015–2019

2020s

In development

Science fiction, fantasy and horror

TV series

See also
List of World War II short films
List of World War II documentary films
List of Allied propaganda films of World War II
List of Holocaust films 
List of partisan films – films about World War II in Yugoslavia

References

Note
 This English language title is a literal translation from its original foreign language title.This title should always be replaced by an English language release title when that information becomes available.

External links
 List of World War II Movies
 World War 2 movies – reviews and trailers for popular World War II movies.

 1990
 
Articles needing Indic script or text